Qaleh-ye Zendlij (also Romanized as Qal‘eh-ye Zendlīj) is a village in Boghrati Rural District, Sardrud District, Razan County, Hamadan Province, Iran. At the 2006 census, its population was 444, in 94 families.

References 

Populated places in Razan County